MYOB is an Australian multinational corporation that provides tax, accounting and other business services software to small and medium businesses.  It is owned by American private equity KKR.

History
MYOB was founded in the early 1980s by a team of developers at Teleware, who developed accounting software. Teleware was purchased by Best Software (now part of Sage) in 1993. Data-Tech Software was the Australian republisher of the MYOB products and, in 1997 entered into an agreement with Best Software to buy the company (renamed MYOB Inc.) and bought the intellectual property rights to the software. In 1999, Data-Tech changed its name to MYOB Limited and listed on the Australian Stock Exchange (ASX) on 9 July. In subsequent corporate development, MYOB Limited merged with Solution 6 Holdings in 2004. Though the company was founded in the United States, it ceased operations outside of Australia and New Zealand in 2008.

Co-founder Brad Shofer left the company in 2003.

On 6 December 2008, Acclivity announced it acquired MYOB US Inc. and its Macintosh (and PC) development team from MYOB Limited of Australia. Acclivity now drives global development of MYOB's Mac OS business management products – AccountEdge Basic, AccountEdge Pro and AccountEdge Pro Network Edition.

In January 2009, a private equity consortium led by Archer Capital completed a takeover bid for MYOB, returning MYOB to private ownership.

On 21 August 2011, Archer Capital sold MYOB to Bain Capital for an undisclosed amount. The acquisition gave Bain Capital a majority stake in MYOB alongside management continued to be shareholders in the company.

MYOB Group Limited was readmitted to the official list of the Australian Securities Exchange on 4 May 2015.

In November 2017, MYOB proposed to buy Reckon's accounting group for $180 million. However, failure to obtain regulatory permission caused the deal to fall apart in May 2018.

In April 2018, MYOB sold its rental payment system RentPay to Rent.com.au for $425,000. In May 2018, MYOB partnered with Network 10's Shark Tank.

MYOB Group Limited was delisted from the ASX on 8 May 2019, after sold to private equity firm Kohlberg Kravis Roberts.

Products
MYOB has a suite of subscription-based products and a browser-based accounting product that was released in August 2010. On 24 October 2012, MYOB released AccountRight Live an update to its flagship product – a Microsoft Windows only software suite which has online storage of data.

Mergers and acquisitions
 Tall Emu CRM 2022
 Greentree on 1 August 2016
 Ace Payroll on 1 June 2015
 IMS Payroll
 PayGlobal
 BankLink 4 June 2013
 Acquired by Bain Capital in Sept 2011
 Smartyhost on 20 August 2008 – divested 5 August 2013
 ilisys on 28 February 2008 – divested 5 August 2013
 Exonet on 5 January 2007 - Tim Molloy, Bruce Carr and Sam Lewis-Roberts
 Comacc Limited on 1 August 2006
 Macquarie Outsource Pty Ltd and Macquarie Outsource Sdn Bhd on 30 March 2006
 Conto Ltd and JumpStart Computer Accounting and Trainers Ltd on 31 January 2006
 Solution 6 Holdings on 29 March 2004
 NZA Gold Limited on 5 March 2003
 Rorquals Business Solutions Limited on 23 November 2000
 SeaSoft Computer Services Sdn Bhd on 9 October 2000
 Professional Tools (NZ) Ltd on 30 November 1999
 Blue Tongue Technology Pty Ltd on 11 October 1999
 CA Systems on 27 September 1999

Acquisitions by Solution 6 before the merger with MYOB
 Xlon Pty Ltd and parent company Ceedata Holdings on 8 December 2000
 VIZTOPIA Software Limited and parent company MICL Holdings Limited on 19 September 2000

Acquisitions by Data-Tech Software Pty Ltd before changing the name to MYOB
 Teletax Systems Pty Ltd on 8 October 1997
 Bestware in 1996

See also
 Comparison of accounting software

References

External links

 Official website

Accounting software
Financial software companies
Point of sale companies
Online financial services companies of Australia
Australian brands
Companies formerly listed on the Australian Securities Exchange
Bain Capital
Kohlberg Kravis Roberts
Companies based in Melbourne